Maija Laurila (born 7 July 1983) is a Finnish former racing cyclist. She won the Finnish national road race title in 2006.

References

External links

1983 births
Living people
Finnish female cyclists
Place of birth missing (living people)